Delphos Local School District, also referred to as Delphos Jefferson, is a school district that serves students in Allen and Van Wert counties in the state of Ohio.  The superintendent of the Delphos City School District is Doug Westrick.  The treasurer is Brad Rostorfer and the assistant treasurer is Carol Sherman.  The school district operates one elementary school, one middle school and one high school.  Franklin Elementary school is located in Allen County, Delphos Jefferson Middle School and the Delphos Jefferson High School are all located in Van Wert County.

Schools

Elementary schools
 Franklin Elementary School

Middle schools
 Delphos Jefferson Middle School

High schools
 Delphos Jefferson High School

External links
 Delphos City Schools Official website
 Landeck Elementary School Official Website
 Franklin Elementary School Official Website
 Delphos Jefferson Middle School Official Website
 Delphos Jefferson High School Official Website
 District Administration Information

School districts in Ohio
Education in Allen County, Ohio
Education in Van Wert County, Ohio
School District